Caldecott is a hamlet in the North Northamptonshire, England, about  east of the centre of Rushden and  south of Raunds.

The villages name means 'Cold cottages'

Parish Church
The Church of England parish church of St John the Baptist is in Caldecott Road between Caldecott and Chelveston. The earliest parts of the church are 13th-century, including the north tower. Part of the chancel is 14th-century. The south porch was built in 1635. The arcades were rebuilt and the north aisle added in 1849–50 to designs by the architect E. F. Law. The church is a Grade II* listed building.

The north tower has a ring of five bells, but currently they are unringable. Accordingly a new electronic bell sound system was installed in 2012.

Church Bells 
Henry Penn of Peterborough cast the second and tenor bells in 1727. Thomas I Eayre of Kettering cast the treble bell in 1744. Robert Taylor of Loughborough cast the third and fourth bells in 1819.

References

Bibliography

External links

Chelveston-cum-Caldecott Parish Council

Hamlets in Northamptonshire
North Northamptonshire